Luna 20  was the second of three successful Soviet lunar sample return missions. It was flown as part of the Luna program as a robotic competitor to the six successful Apollo lunar sample return missions.

Overview
Luna 20 was placed in an intermediate Earth parking orbit and from this orbit was sent towards the Moon. It entered lunar orbit on 18 February 1972. On 21 February 1972, Luna 20 soft landed on the Moon in a mountainous area known as the Terra Apollonius (or Apollonius highlands) near Mare Fecunditatis (Sea of Fertility), 120 km from where Luna 16 had landed. While on the lunar surface, the panoramic television system was operated. Lunar samples were obtained by means of an extendable drilling apparatus. The ascent stage of Luna 20 was launched from the lunar surface on 22 February 1972 carrying 1.9 ounces (55 grams) of collected lunar samples in a sealed capsule. It landed in the Soviet Union on 25 February 1972. The lunar samples were recovered the following day.

This was the eighth Soviet spacecraft launched with the intent of returning lunar soil to Earth. It was evidently sent to complete the mission that Luna 18 had failed to accomplish. After a 4.5-day flight to the Moon, which included a single midcourse correction on 15 February, Luna 20 entered orbit around the Moon on 18 February. Initial orbital parameters were 100 x 100 kilometers at 65° inclination.

Three days later, at 19:13 UT, the spacecraft fired its main engine for 267 seconds to begin descent to the lunar surface. A second firing further reduced velocity before Luna 20 set down safely on the Moon at 19:19 UT on 21 February 1972 at coordinates 3.7863 North and 56.6242 East, only 1.8 kilometers from the crash site of Luna 18.

After collecting a small sample of lunar soil, the spacecraft's ascent stage lifted off at 22:58 UT on 22 February and quickly accelerated to 2.7 kilometers per second velocity—sufficient to return to Earth. The small spherical capsule eventually parachuted down safely on an island in the Karkingir River, 40 kilometers north of the town of Jezkazgan in Kazakhstan, at 19:19 UT on 25 February 1972.

The 55-gram soil sample differed from that collected by Luna 16 in that the majority (50 to 60%) of the rock particles in the newer sample were ancient lunar highlands anorthosite (which consists largely of feldspar) rather than the basalt of the earlier one (which contained about 1 to 2% of anorthosite). The American Apollo 16 mission returned similar highlands material two months later.

Like the Luna 16 soil, samples of the Luna 20 collection were shared with American and French scientists. A 0.4983g sample of material from a depth of 27and 32 cm was sent to Britain.

In March 2010, NASA reported that its Lunar Reconnaissance Orbiter satellite had spotted Luna 20 on the lunar surface.

See also

 Timeline of artificial satellites and space probes
 List of artificial objects on the Moon (descent stage)

References

External links
 Zarya - Luna program chronology
 NASA NSSDC Master Catalog

Luna programme
Sample return missions
Missions to the Moon
Soft landings on the Moon
1972 in the Soviet Union
Spacecraft launched in 1972
1972 on the Moon